Mark Joseph Daly is Director of the Finnish Institute for Molecular Medicine (FIMM) at the University of Helsinki, a Professor of Genetics at Harvard Medical School, Chief of the Analytic and Translational Genetic Unit at Massachusetts General Hospital, and a member of the Broad Institute of MIT and Harvard. In the early days of the Human Genome Project, Daly helped develop the genetic model by which linkage disequilibrium could be used to map the haplotype structure of the human genome. In addition, he developed statistical methods to find associations between genes and disorders such as Crohn's disease, inflammatory bowel disease, autism and schizophrenia.

Daly is considered a pioneer in the field of human genetics, and is amongst the most cited scientists in the field, and one of the top 100 most cited scientists of all time. He was elected to the National Academy of Medicine in 2017.

Education
Daly studied physics at MIT, although he initially wanted to become a lawyer or poker player, he joined Eric Lander as a freshman. Mark continued to work with Lander, before eventually receiving his PhD from Leiden University in 2004.

Research

Daly trained with Eric Lander at the Whitehead Institute, and most of his initial efforts were to map haplotypes across the human genome. During his time there, his team developed MapMaker, GeneHunter, Haploview, PLINK, and GATK. Collectively these tools have received over 30,000 citations. As genome sequencing has become cheaper, his group works on developing statistical methods to implicate genetic mutations in neuropsychiatric diseases.

References

Living people
1967 births
American geneticists
Genetic epidemiologists
Harvard Medical School faculty
Massachusetts Institute of Technology School of Science alumni
Leiden University alumni
American expatriates in Finland
Members of the National Academy of Medicine